Prognathodes obliquus, the oblique butterflyfish is a species of marine ray-finned fish, a butterflyfish belonging to the family Chaetodontidae. It is endemic to St Paul Rocks in the southwestern Atlantic Ocean off Brazil.

Destruction of its habitat by pollution, marine construction and pollution has rendered it vulnerable to extinction.

References

Fauna of Brazil
obliquus
Endemic fauna of Brazil
Taxa named by Roger Lubbock
Taxa named by Alasdair James Edwards
Fish described in 1980
Taxonomy articles created by Polbot